The National Socialist Workers' Party of Denmark (DNSAP) was the largest Nazi Party in Denmark before and during the Second World War.

History
The party was founded on 16 November 1930, after the success of the Nazis in the German Reichstag elections of that year. The party mimicked the National Socialist German Workers' Party (Nazi Party) in Germany, including the use of the swastika and Hitler salute, the naming of their fighting force as SA, and even the singing of a translated version of the Horst Wessel Song. The party was antisemitic, though not to the same degree as the German Nazis.

The party had other differences with the Germans; as Danish nationalists, they wanted the Danish border to grow to the south to take in the whole of the historical Duchy of Schleswig, a move which would have brought more ethnic Germans under Danish rule. The DNSAP considered the Germans of North and South Schleswig to be in reality Germanized Danes, who could be politically led back to their Danish origin. The Germans wanted to incorporate the northern portion of Schleswig into the German state. The DNSAP was also supportive of the principles of loyalty to the Danish monarchy and the Church of Denmark.

The party was initially led by Cay Lembcke, although they attracted no more than a few hundred members under his leadership and failed to gain even minor support in the elections of 1932.

Lembcke was replaced in 1933 by Frits Clausen, who concentrated the activities in his home territory of North Schleswig, where the bulk of support for the DNSAP was to come from. At the 1939 elections, with about 5000 members, the party won three seats in the Folketing (parliament), corresponding to 1.8% of the popular vote.

DNSAP supported Hitler's invasion and subsequent occupation of Denmark on 9 April 1940. A transition to Nazi government in Denmark was considered by the German administrator, Cecil von Renthe-Fink, in the end of 1940, but due to the policy of co-operation with the legitimate Danish government, it was deemed better to wait until Germany had won the war, although DNSAP did receive some financial and political support from Germany. A major factor influencing Renthe-Fink's decision was the failure of the party's rally on 17 November 1940, planned to be the signal of the party's takeover of political power in Denmark. The rally was confronted by a huge and hostile crowd, outnumbering the participants several times, and the party members had to be protected by the Danish police. After the rally, the police had to escort the participants to safety to save them from being attacked and beaten up by the bystanders.

A rare victory for the DNSAP was its role in organizing the recruitment for Waffen-SS and Frikorps Danmark (Free Corps Denmark). The DNSAP was not included in the wartime coalition government (1940–1943) and at the 1943 elections it barely improved on its pre-war performance, winning only 2.1% of the votes cast and three seats in the Folketing. The day after the election, the disappointed Clausen renounced German financial support, intending to take a more purely Danish national line.

After the end of the Second World War, the party was officially dissolved in May 1945, and lost almost all of its popular support. However, a few individuals continued their work under the old party name. The current National Socialist Movement of Denmark traces its origins back to the DNSAP.

Storm Afdeling

The D.N.S.A.P. had its own Storm Troopers — the S.A. whose normal service dress was a brown shirt with black breeches and black top boots, a black tie and a black brassard with white swastika. Headgear could be either a black peaked cap or black forage cap. On the peaked cap was a two-part badge consisting of the nation cockade of Denmark and a runic "S" and "A" within white circle. "Full dress" uniform consisted of a brown tunic, black breeches, Sam Browne belt and a cross strap worn with a khaki shirt and tie, and forage cap. On duty, guards wore a Danish army steel helmet with a runic S.A. badge.

Electoral performance

Upper house (Landsting)

Parliament (Folketing)

See also
 Ranks and insignia of the National Socialist Workers' Party of Denmark
Søren Kam
Carl Værnet

References
Citations

Bibliography

External links
www.milhist.dk (in Danish)

Political parties disestablished in 1945
Defunct political parties in Denmark
Political parties established in 1930
Nazi parties
Danish collaborators with Nazi Germany
1930 establishments in Denmark
1945 disestablishments in Denmark
Banned far-right parties
Monarchist parties
Antisemitism in Europe